S.W. Snowden Elementary School is a school located in Aurora, Beaufort County, North Carolina. It currently teaches grades pre-kindergarten to 8th grade.

History

Two schools

Since 1909 there were several small schools for both blacks and whites in the Aurora area of Beaufort County. In 1915 a school for whites was built in Aurora. In 1916 Aurora got its first black school which had land purchased for it in 1914 and it was called the Aurora School. In 1923 the first Aurora High School was built. In 1928 Aurora High School added a gym. Also, in 1928 all of the small black county schools came together to form a new Aurora school. In 1932 Aurora High School added vocational education to its curriculum. From 1941 to 1943 construction was done on the new comprehensive Aurora School that included a high school. In 1949 the Aurora School added agriculture and shop buildings. 

The 1928 Aurora High School was used for grades 1–12 until 1969 when the two schools were combined together and Aurora High School became the high school with grades 8–12 and the S.W. Snowden school as it was known then became the elementary school for grades 1–7.

These two schools were located on the same town block.

One School

In 1966 Freedom of choice was put into effect in NC where anyone of any race could attend either school. In 1969 the S.W. Snowden High School and Aurora High School merged to serve both blacks and whites noted as total desegregation. The S.W. Snowden campus became the elementary school serving grades kindergarten to 7th grade, and Aurora High served grades 8–12 in 1969. In 1992 S.W. Snowden received a new library. Southside High School (North Carolina) was created in 2000 and Aurora High School students began attending Southside. Aurora High School was renamed Aurora Middle School as sixth, seventh and eighth graders from S.W. Snowden now attended Aurora Middle School. In 2007, S.W. Snowden was closed and an addition was made to Aurora Middle School to house pre-kindergarten to 5th grade. At this point Aurora Middle School was renamed S.W. Snowden. The old Gator mascot was changed to The Mighty Trojans.

Milestones
In 1930 the school year was extended from 4 to 6 months.
In 1934 students in the county started using buses.
In 1945 twelfth grade was added to schools.
In 1965 the county started the kindergarten program.
In 1988 pre-kindergarten programs were added.
In 1990 all classrooms were air conditioned.

References

Public middle schools in North Carolina
Public elementary schools in North Carolina
Schools in Beaufort County, North Carolina